The People's Self-Defense (Narodnaya samooborona) is a Russian anarchist organisation.

The organization emerged in 2013 as a result of the split of Autonomous Action, the largest Russian anarchist organization at the time. At the beginning it was called Autonomous Action (Social Revolutionary) (AD-SR; ; Avtonomnoye deystviye (sotsial-revolyutsionnoye), AD-SR), and in 2015 it was renamed "People's Self-Defense". One of its leaders was Svyatoslav Rechkalov.

The organization positions itself as a "non-partisan socio-political organization" and an anarchist media platform that publishes articles on anarchism and news about actions. She was also involved in the protection of residents of the evicted hostels, the fight against employers who do not pay salaries to workers. Members of the organization were on duty in the apartments that the collectors tried to take away from the residents of Moscow.

A report received by RIA Novosti from law enforcement agencies says that from December 2017 to December 2018, supporters of People's Self-Defense carried out 247 "actions of an extremist nature" in 40 cities of Russia, including one terrorist act in Arkhangelsk, one fact of public justifications for terrorist activities and five cases of hooliganism and vandalism.

On March 14, 2018, Svyatoslav Rechkalov was detained for two days. According to him, he was beaten, tortured with electric shocks, demanding to reveal the names of other anarchists and to confess his involvement in their actions. After his release, Rechkalov received political asylum in France.

In September 2022, the Chelyabinsk Regional Court recognized the People's Self-Defense as a terrorist organization.

External links 
 Official site

References

2013 establishments in Russia
Anarchist organizations in Russia
Anarcho-communism
Human rights in Russia
Organizations established in 2013
Police misconduct